Thanaa Debsi (born 1941) is a Syrian actress.

Life
Born in Aleppo, in 1941, Debsi began acting in films from 1963 and joined the Syrian Order of Artists in 1968. She then married the Syrian actor Salim Sabri. The couple has three children, the eldest is Reem born in 1965, the second is Yara, who is working in the film industry and the third is the only son Thayer. Thanaa is the sister of Saraa Debsi.

Filmography

On television
الشمس تشرق من جديد (The Sun shines again)
سيرة آل جلالي (Biography of Al-Jalil)
البيت القديم (The old house)
القناع (The mask)
غزلان في غابة الذئاب (Deer in the Forest of Wolves)
قوس قزح (Rainbow)
الميراث (Inheritance)
الواهمون (Al-Wahmon)
عشاء الوداع (Farewell dinner)
عصي الدمع (Hard Tears)
زمن العار (Time of Shame)
وراء الشمس (Behind the Sun)
الزعيم (The leader)
بنات العيلة (Daughters of Eila)

Theatre
الأشجار تموت واقفة (Trees die standing)
الأشباح (The Ghosts)
التنين (The Dragon)
رجل القدر (Man of Fate)

References

1941 births
Syrian actresses
Living people